Emarginula adriatica is a species of sea snail, a marine gastropod mollusk in the family Fissurellidae, the keyhole limpets.

Description
The size of the shell varies between 7 mm and 15 mm.

Distribution
This marine species occurs in the Mediterranean Sea and in the Atlantic Ocean from the Bay of Biscay to Madeira.

References

External links
 

Fissurellidae
Gastropods described in 1829